Leopold Richter (22 May 1885 – 3 August 1941) was a German international footballer who played for Dresdner SC and VfB Leipzig. He was also capped once for the German national team in 1909.

References

External links
 

1885 births
1941 deaths
Association football midfielders
German footballers
Germany international footballers
1. FC Lokomotive Leipzig players
Dresdner SC players
Footballers from Dresden